A World of Ideas was a PBS miniseries (1988 and 1990) by Bill Moyers. It featured notable interviews with such personalities as Isaac Asimov, Noam Chomsky, Elaine Pagels, and Chungliang Al Huang.

External links
http://billmoyers.com/series/a-world-of-ideas/
Review of A World of Ideas in the Los Angeles Times

PBS original programming
1988 American television series debuts
1990 American television series endings